Guha may refer to:

 Guha (surname), including a list of people with the name
 Guha, a name of the Hindu god Kartikeya
 Guha (film), a 1981 Malayalam film
 Guha (Ramayana), a character in the Hindu epic

See also 
 Guhe (disambiguation)
 Guhan, Iran, a village